State Route 648 (SR 648) runs from Kietzke Lane (SR 667) east along E. Second Street in Reno and Glendale Avenue in Sparks to S. McCarran Boulevard (SR 659).

Route description

SR 648 begins at the intersection of E. Second Street and Kietzke Lane (SR 667) in Reno. The road follows Second Street eastward, and quickly comes to an interchange with Interstate 580 and US 395, which is also known as the Martin Luther King Jr Memorial Highway and the Three Flags Highway. SR 648 passes over the Truckee River, where it enters Sparks and the road name changes to Glendale Avenue. Passing through an urban area, the road intersects Rock Boulevard (SR 668) heading east. The route terminates at the intersection of Glendale Avenue and McCarran Boulevard (SR 659), a major arterial encircling the Reno-Sparks area.

History
Formerly, State Route 648 continued westward through downtown Reno along Second Street to its terminus at West Fourth Street (SR 647, I-80 Business, Old US 40). By 2001, the highway was truncated to the current segment and a  segment from Fourth Street east under the Union Pacific Railroad tracks. This western segment was removed by 2005 as the Reno Transportation Rail Access Corridor (ReTRAC) track reconstruction eliminated the Second Street railroad underpass.

Major intersections

See also

References

648
Transportation in Washoe County, Nevada